The 2008–09 WICB President's Cup was the 35th edition of the Regional Super50, the domestic limited-overs cricket competition for the countries of the West Indies Cricket Board (WICB).

Squads

Group stage

Knock Outs

Semi-finals

Final

Statistics

Most runs
The top five run scorers (total runs) are included in this table.

Source: [Cricinfo]

Most wickets
The top five wicket takers are listed in this table, listed by wickets taken and then by bowling average.

Source: [ Cricinfo]

References

2008 in West Indian cricket
2008–09 West Indian cricket season
Regional Super50 seasons